A sweetener is a substance added to food or drink to impart the flavor of sweetness, either because it contains a type of sugar, or because it contains a sweet-tasting sugar substitute. Many artificial sweeteners have been invented and are now used in commercially produced food and drink. Natural non-sugar sweeteners also exist, such as glycyrrhizin found in liquorice.

List of sweeteners 
 Sugar
Sugar alcohol
Sucrose, or glucose-fructose, commonly called table sugar
Fructose, or fruit sugar
Glucose, or dextrose
Sugar substitute, or artificial sweetener
Syrups
Agave syrup, or agave nectar
Maple syrup
Corn syrup
High-fructose corn syrup (HFCS), used industrially
Honey
Unrefined sweetener

See also 
 Sweet (disambiguation)
 Sweetness (disambiguation)
 Sugar free (disambiguation)

References 

Food additives